Arthur Massey Skeffington (4 September 1909 – 18 February 1971) was a British Labour Party politician who served as a Member of Parliament (MP) for 23 years from 1945 until his death in 1971.

Early life
Educated at Streatham Grammar School and the University of London, Skeffington graduated with a BSc in Economics. He lectured in economics, was a member of the Fabian Society and was elected to the National Executive of the Labour Party.

At the 1935 general election he unsuccessfully contested the parliamentary seat of Streatham. He also failed to be elected when a by-election was held at Lewisham West in 1938.

During the Second World War he worked for the Board of Trade on concentration of industry and for the Ministry of Supply on the production of medical supplies.

Parliamentary career
Skeffington was elected at the 1945 general election as MP for Lewisham West, but lost his seat at the 1950 general election.

In 1950 he was elected to the London County Council to represent Peckham, holding the seat until 1958. he was called to the bar at the Middle Temple in 1951.

Skeffington successfully contested the Hayes and Harlington by-election in 1953, which he won, thereby being returned to Parliament. He served as MP for that constituency in the House of Commons until his death in 1971, at the age of 61.

From 1967 to 1970, he was Parliamentary Private Secretary to the Minister for Housing and Local Government.  Skeffington was also Chairman of Labour's National Executive Committee from 1969 to 1970.

Outside politics
A keen cricketer, he played cricket for Surrey 2nd XI.

References

Sources

External links 
 

1909 births
1971 deaths
20th-century British lawyers
Alumni of the University of London
Chairs of the Fabian Society
Chairs of the Labour Party (UK)
Labour Party (UK) MPs for English constituencies
Members of London County Council
Members of the Middle Temple
Ministers in the Wilson governments, 1964–1970
People from Meopham
UK MPs 1945–1950
UK MPs 1951–1955
UK MPs 1955–1959
UK MPs 1959–1964
UK MPs 1964–1966
UK MPs 1966–1970
UK MPs 1970–1974